The 2015–16 season of the Turkish Women's First Football League is the 20th season of Turkey's premier women's football league. Konak Belediyespor is the champion of the season

Teams

League table

Results

Topscorers

.

References

External links
 Kadınlar 1. Ligi 2015 – 2016 Sezonu 

2015
2015–16 domestic women's association football leagues
Women's